The Marine Corps Combat Instructor Ribbon is a military award of the United States Marine Corps established by Secretary of the Navy Ray Mabus in August 2014. The ribbon recognizes the successful completion of a tour as a combat instructor, or in a high-profile leadership position, at the School of Infantry East or West.

Appearance
The ribbon is chamois in color with edges of olive green, with the center being a stripe of black. Subsequent awards of the ribbon are denoted by bronze service stars, with a silver 3/16 inch star worn to denote a sixth award.

References

External links

Awards and decorations of the United States Marine Corps
Awards established in 2014
Military ribbons of the United States
2014 establishments in the United States